Zura or Zur'a may refer to:

People with the given name Zura
 Zura Barayeva (died 2002), a Chechen participant in the Moscow theater hostage crisis
 Zura Begum, a Union of Burma legislator and member of the Burmese parliament in the 1950s
 Zura Bitiyeva (1948–2003), a Chechen human rights activist, assassinated in 2003
 Zura Karuhimbi (1925–2018), a Rwandan humanitarian
 Zura Tkemaladze (born 2000), a Georgian tennis player

People with the surname Zura
 Abu Zurʽa al-Razi (died 878), an Iranian Muslim scholar
 Edmundo Zura (born 1983), an Ecuadorian footballer
 Ibn Zur'a (943–1008), a philosopher in Baghdad

Other uses
 Zura, Afghanistan, a village in Balkh Province
 Zura, a language related to the Enya language of the Democratic Republic of the Congo
 Moḩammad Zūrā, a village in Iran
 Ercheia zura, also known as Ercheia diversipennis, a species of moth

See also
 Zuras, a Marvel comics character